Rhoemetalces I (Sapaean) was king of the Sapaean kingdom of Thrace from 15 BC to 12 AD. He was king of Odrysian kingdom of Thrace in succession to his nephew Rhescuporis II (Astaean).

Rhoemetalces I was a loyal ally to the first Roman Emperor Augustus. He was a direct descendant of the Thracian King Cotys I (Sapaean), and the middle child of the earlier Thracian king Cotys II (Sapaean). His younger brother was Rhescuporis II (Sapaean); his sister married to Cotys VII (Astaean).

When Cotys VII died about 48 BC Rhoemetalces I became the guardian of his nephew Rhescuporis II (Astaean), his sister's young son and heir. Rhescuporis II (Astaean) died in 13 BC, when he was defeated and slain in battle by Vologases, chief of the Thracian Bessi, who was a leader in the revolt against the Romans in that year.

During this revolt Rhoemetalces I and his family fled Thrace, returning only when it ended, when Augustus returned the kingdom to his family. As Rhescuporis II (Astaean) had left no heir, Rhoemetalces I became King of whole Thrace in 12 BC. The Roman Historian Tacitus, describes him as ‘attractive and civilized’. His wife and the mother of his heir, known only through numismatic evidence, was Queen Pythodoris I.

Rhoemetalces I ruled Thrace until his death in 12. Augustus then divided his realm into two separate kingdoms, one half for his son Cotys III (Sapaean) to rule and the other half for Rhoemetalces's remaining brother Rhescuporis II (Sapaean). Tacitus states that Cotys III received the cultivated parts, most towns and most Greek cities of Thrace, while Rhescuporis II (Sapaean) received the wild and savage portion with enemies on its frontier.

Sources
 Smith, William, ed. Dictionary of Greek and Roman Biography and Mythology. Boston : Little, Brown, and Company, 1867, v. 3, p. 653

Notes

12 deaths
Thracian kings
Roman client rulers
1st-century BC rulers in Europe
1st-century monarchs in Europe
Year of birth unknown